Ricardo Valderrama (born 16 January 1987 in Caracas) is a Venezuelan judoka. At the 2012 Summer Olympics he competed in the Men's 66 kg, but was defeated in the second round.

References

Venezuelan male judoka
Living people
Olympic judoka of Venezuela
Judoka at the 2012 Summer Olympics
1987 births
Sportspeople from Caracas
Pan American Games medalists in judo
Pan American Games bronze medalists for Venezuela
South American Games gold medalists for Venezuela
South American Games medalists in judo
Judoka at the 2011 Pan American Games
Judoka at the 2019 Pan American Games
Competitors at the 2010 South American Games
Medalists at the 2011 Pan American Games
Medalists at the 2019 Pan American Games
20th-century Venezuelan people
21st-century Venezuelan people